Wolf–Hirschhorn syndrome (WHS) is a chromosomal deletion syndrome resulting from a partial deletion on the short arm of chromosome 4 (del(4p16.3)). Features include a distinct craniofacial phenotype and intellectual disability.

Signs and symptoms

The most common characteristics include a distinct craniofacial phenotype (microcephaly, micrognathia, short philtrum, prominent glabella, ocular hypertelorism, dysplastic ears and periauricular tags), growth restriction, intellectual disability, muscle hypotonia, seizures, and congenital heart defects. 

Less common characteristics include hypospadias, colobomata of the iris, renal anomalies, and deafness. Antibody deficiencies are also common, including common variable immunodeficiency and IgA deficiency.  T-cell immunity is normal.

Genetics
Wolf–Hirschhorn syndrome is a microdeletion syndrome caused by a deletion within HSA band 4p16.3 of the short arm of chromosome 4, particularly in the region of WHSCR1 and WHSCR2. The phenotypic characteristics of WHS are thought to be caused by the haploinsufficiency of the genes Wolf-Hirschhorn syndrome candidate 1 (WHSC1), which is associated with craniofacial features and growth delay, and Homo Sapiens leucine zipper-EF-hand containing transmembrane protein 1 (LETM1), which is associated with seizures.

About 87% of cases represent a de novo deletion, while about 13% are inherited from a parent with a chromosome translocation.  In the cases of familial transmission, there is a 2 to 1 excess of maternal transmission.  Of the de novo cases, 80% are paternally derived.

Severity of symptoms and expressed phenotype differ based on the amount of genetic material deleted. The critical region for determining the phenotype is at 4p16.3 and can often be detected through genetic testing and fluorescence in situ hybridization (FISH). Genetic testing and genetic counseling is offered to affected families.

Diagnosis

Initial diagnosis is based on a distinct craniofacial phenotype after birth. Diagnosis of WHS is confirmed by the detection of a deletion in the WHSCR.
Chromosomal microarray and Cytogenetic analysis.D4S96 or D4Z1 chromosome band 4p16.3–specific probe (Wolf-Hirschhorn region, Vysis, Inc) is available for FISH study.

Epidemiology
The minimum birth incidence has been estimated as 1 in 50,000.

History
Wolf–Hirschhorn syndrome was first described in 1961 by the Austrian-born American pediatrician Kurt Hirschhorn and his colleagues.

Thereafter, the syndrome gained worldwide attention after publications by the German geneticist Ulrich Wolf and his co-workers, specifically their articles in the German scientific magazine Humangenetik.

References

External links 

 https://www.ncbi.nlm.nih.gov/books/NBK1183/
 Wolf-Hirschhorn syndrome on Genetics Home Reference

Autosomal monosomies and deletions
Rare syndromes
Genodermatoses